The Captain from Köpenick may refer to:
	
 The Captain from Köpenick (1926 film), a German silent film
 The Captain from Köpenick (1931 film), a German film
 The Captain from Köpenick (1945 film), an American film completed in 1941 and released in 1945
 The Captain from Köpenick (1956 film), a West-German film

See also
 Der Hauptmann von Köpenick (disambiguation)